Mems or MEMS may refer to:

 Microelectromechanical systems, the technology of microscopic devices, particularly those with moving parts
 Modular Engine Management System, an electronic control system used on engines in passenger cars built by Rover Group
 Mem (computing), a measurement unit for the number of memory accesses

See also
 Mem (disambiguation)